The Weslaco East High School (established 2000) is a school in Weslaco, Texas, USA. It is the second high school to be established in Weslaco (after the Weslaco High School). In the first year of the school, Weslaco East High School served only 9th and 10th grade students while Weslaco High School served 11th and 12th grade students.

In 2002, Weslaco East earned the TEA "Recognized School" rating for a Weslaco, Texas High School and for the two years after that. Weslaco East then added an 11th grade class in the 2002-03 school year and a 12th grade class the following year and that same year, the Governor of Texas, Mr. Rick Perry, visit Weslaco East High School.

In the school year of 2007-08 and also again in 2009-10, Weslaco East High School received a Silver Medal Rating from the U.S. News & World Report, and Weslaco East was marked as one of the Top High Schools in the United States.
In the school year of 2012, there were enough students enrolled in Weslaco East to be re-labeled as a ‘’5A‘’ school. The school was classified "6A" in the 2014 realignment.

Weslaco East High serves the following areas: Much of Weslaco, the western portion of Mercedes, Llano Grande, half of Olivarez, and a section of the WISD portion of Mila Doce.

Clubs and organizations 
There are a total of 29 clubs and organizations that are at Weslaco East High school.

References

External links
 
 Weslaco Independent School District
 USNews

See also

Education in the United States

High schools in Hidalgo County, Texas
Public high schools in Texas